Baramunda is a locality in Bhubaneswar city in Odisha, India. Its postal head office is at Suryanagar (Khorda).

Geography 
Baramunda is a locality situated in the west of the New Capital, Bhubaneswar. It is surrounded by famous localities Surya Nagar, Irc Village, Jagamara, Nayapalli, and Gopabandhu Nagar.

Transport 
Lingaraj Temple Road Rail Way Station is one of the nearest railway stations in Baramunda situated at a distance of 7.5 kilometer.

ISBT project 
A hi-tech bus stand is being developed in Baramunda by The Bhubaneswar Development Authority (BDA) on 15.5 acres piece of land. The bus depot at Khandagiri is also part of the project, with a capability of 300 parking spaces.

References 

Neighbourhoods in Bhubaneswar